The 2005 FC Rubin Kazan season was the club's 3rd season in the Russian Premier League, the highest tier of association football in Russia. They finished the season in fourth position, qualifying for the Second Round of 2006–07 UEFA Cup and progressed to the Round 16 in the Russian Cup.

Season review

Squad

On loan

Left club during season

Transfers

In

Loans in

Loans out

Released

Competitions

Premier League

Results by round

Results

League table

Russian Cup

2005-06

The Round of 16 games took place during the 2006 season.

Squad statistics

Appearances and goals

|-
|colspan="14"|Players away from the club on loan:
|-
|colspan="14"|Players who appeared for Rubin Kazan but left during the season:

|}

Goal scorers

Disciplinary record

References

FC Rubin Kazan seasons
Rubin Kazan